Thomas Cochrane may refer to:
Thomas Cochrane, 8th Earl of Dundonald (1691–1778), Scottish nobleman and politician
Thomas Cochrane, 10th Earl of Dundonald (1775–1860), British Marquis of Maranhão, naval officer and radical politician
Thomas Cochrane, 11th Earl of Dundonald (1814–1885), Scottish nobleman, son of the above, father of the 1st Baron Cochrane of Cults
Thomas Cochrane, 13th Earl of Dundonald (1886–1958), British Army officer, representative peer
Thomas Cochrane, 1st Baron Cochrane of Cults (1857–1951), Scottish Unionist politician and nobleman
Thomas (Robert) Cochrane (died 1482), favourite of King James III of Scotland
Thomas John Cochrane (1789–1872), English naval officer and first governor of the colony of Newfoundland
Thomas Cochrane (doctor) (1866–1953), Scottish medical missionary to China
Tom Cochrane (born 1953), Canadian singer-songwriter and musician
 Thomas Cochran (Nova Scotia politician)

See also 
Thomas Cochran (disambiguation)